King King may refer to:
 King King (band), a British blues rock group
 King King (album), a 1992 album by The Red Devils
 Sieh King King (1883–1960), Chinese-American feminist activist
 James King King (1806–1881), British politician
 Tong King King (born 1965), Hong Kong fencer